Combat is purposeful violent conflict.

Combat may also refer to:

Military
Combat (French Resistance), a large organisation of French resistance fighters during World War II 
Combat (newspaper), a French Resistance publication founded during World War II
Kombat (military rank), a rank in the Red Army until the end of 1930s
Kombat (photograph), a 1942 World War II photograph by Max Alpert

Entertainment

Music

Labels 

Combat Records, an independent New York record label, predominantly of punk rock and heavy metal groups

Songs 

 "Combat", by Heaven Shall Burn from the album Invictus (Iconoclast III)
 "Combat", by Deftones from the album Saturday Night Wrist
 "Combat", by Flobots from the album Fight with Tools

Television

Programs 

 Combat!, an American television program that originally aired on ABC from 1962 until 1967

Episodes 

"Combat" (Torchwood), an episode from the British science fiction drama Torchwood

Video games 

Telstar Combat!, an early dedicated video game console by Coleco in 1977 featuring battling tanks
Combat (Atari 2600), a battling tanks and planes video game for the Atari 2600 from 1977
Combat 2, a cancelled Atari 2600 game
Combat (1985 video game), a light gun arcade shooting game made by Exidy in 1985

Films 

The Combat (1916 film), a lost silent film drama
The Combat (1926 film), an American silent western film

Other uses
Aeros Combat, a hang glider
ALFA Combat, a Czech-made semi-automatic pistol
Combat (horse), a Thoroughbred racehorse 
Combat (juggling), a competitive game played by jugglers
ComBat, Dennis Lillee's notorious aluminum cricket bat
 Combat trousers, shorts, or "combats", also known as cargo pants
Tanfoglio T95 or Combat, a semi-automatic pistol
The Combat: Woman Pleading for the Vanquished, a painting by William Etty

See also

Kombat (disambiguation)
Fight (disambiguation)